Frank Hotaling (April 4, 1909 – April 13, 1977) was an American art director, born in New York City, whose career encompassed over 100 films, mostly B movies. His association with famed director John Ford led to an Oscar nomination, shared with John McCarthy Jr. and Charles S. Thompson, for Best Art Direction-Set Direction, Color, for 1952's The Quiet Man. This brought an upsurge in his film work and allowed Hotaling the opportunity to work on such A-list projects as Ford's The Searchers (1956), Delmer Daves' 3:10 to Yuma (1957), and William Wyler's The Big Country (1958).

Hotaling died in Woodland Hills, Los Angeles, California.

Selected filmography
 Wyoming (1947)
 The Dakota Kid (1951)

External links

American art directors
1909 births
1977 deaths